Anthony Hamilton Jones (born September 13, 1962) is an American retired professional basketball player. He was a 6'6" (198 cm) 195 lb (89 kg) swingman and played collegiately at Georgetown University from 1981 to 1983, and at University of Nevada, Las Vegas from 1984 to 1986. He played in the NBA from 1986 to 1990.

Jones was selected with the 21st pick of the first round in the 1986 NBA draft by the Washington Bullets. He played for the Bullets, Chicago Bulls, San Antonio Spurs, and Dallas Mavericks. He also played in Italy for Libertas Livorno, and in the USBL and WBL.

Notes

External links
NBA stats @ basketballreference.com

1962 births
Living people
20th-century African-American sportspeople
21st-century African-American people
African-American basketball players
American expatriate basketball people in Italy
American men's basketball players
Basketball players from Washington, D.C.
Chicago Bulls players
Dallas Mavericks players
Dunbar High School (Washington, D.C.) alumni
Georgetown Hoyas men's basketball players
Libertas Liburnia Basket Livorno players
McDonald's High School All-Americans
Parade High School All-Americans (boys' basketball)
Pensacola Tornados (1986–1991) players
San Antonio Spurs players
Shooting guards
United States Basketball League players
UNLV Runnin' Rebels basketball players
Washington Bullets draft picks
Washington Bullets players